Edward Brouncker, D.D. was a  17th-century Anglican priest.

Brouncker graduated from St Edmund Hall, Oxford in 1609 and became a Fellow at Wadham College, Oxford. He held livings at Cropredy, Ladbroke and Eccleston; and was Dean of Lismore
  during 1621.

References

Alumni of St Edmund Hall, Oxford
Fellows of Wadham College, Oxford
17th-century English Anglican priests
Deans of Lismore
Year of birth missing
Year of death missing